Patience Okon George  (born 25 November 1991) is a Nigerian sprinter. She competed in the 400 metres event at the 2015 World Championships in Athletics in Beijing, China and also at the 2016 Rio Olympic Games. George is a two-time African Championships bronze medallist in the individual 400 metres event. She is also a three-time Nigerian national champion in the 400 metres.

On 2 August 2014, she ran the first leg of the 4 × 400 m relay for the Nigerian team that came second behind the Jamaican quartet at the Glasgow Commonwealth Games. She also ran in the heats of the 4 × 100 m relay for Nigeria.

Okon George won a bronze medal at the 2014 African Championships in Marrakesh, behind fellow Nigerian, Sade Abugan and Kabange Mupopo of Zambia. She also won a gold medal in the 4 × 400 m relay with teammates Regina George, Ada Benjamin, and Sade Abugan.

In 2015, Okon George set a new PB of 50.76s in the 400 m at the Resisprint meeting in the Swiss city of La Chaux-de-Fonds. This was her first time under the 51s barrier. At the 2015 World Championships in Athletics, she equalled her PB in the semi-finals of the women's 400 m after posting a time of 50.87 s to qualify third fastest in her heat. Later on, in the year at the All Africa Games, she won a silver medal behind Kabange Mupopo in a new personal best of 50.71 s.

She won her second individual African Championships bronze medal in the 400 metres at the 2016 Durban Championships. She placed third behind Mupopo and Margaret Wambui. She also anchored the Nigerian 4 × 400 m quartet (Omolara Omotosho, Regina George, Yinka Ajayi, Patience Okon George) to a silver medal on the last day of the championships. She also successfully defended her national title in 2016 and sealed her spot for the Rio Olympic Games.

In 2019, George won the gold medal in the women's 4 × 400 metres relay at the 2019 African Games held in Rabat, Morocco.

International competitions

1Representing Africa

References

External links
 

1991 births
Living people
Nigerian female sprinters
World Athletics Championships athletes for Nigeria
Athletes (track and field) at the 2015 African Games
Commonwealth Games silver medallists for Nigeria
Athletes (track and field) at the 2016 Summer Olympics
Olympic athletes of Nigeria
Athletes (track and field) at the 2014 Commonwealth Games
Athletes (track and field) at the 2018 Commonwealth Games
Commonwealth Games medallists in athletics
African Games gold medalists for Nigeria
African Games medalists in athletics (track and field)
People from Cross River State
African Games silver medalists for Nigeria
Athletes (track and field) at the 2019 African Games
Athletes (track and field) at the 2020 Summer Olympics
Olympic female sprinters
21st-century Nigerian women
Medallists at the 2014 Commonwealth Games
Medallists at the 2018 Commonwealth Games